Bokito may refer to:

Bokito, Cameroon
Bokito (gorilla)